Matuku is a tiny island in Lulunga, a part of Haapai in Tonga. It is easily reached by outboard motorboat from the neighbouring hub of Haafeva and is on the course from there to the culturally important island of Kotu.

The main village is on the northwest side. It has a government primary school. A wharf is constructed on the east side, but it is never used.

The island had a population of 89 in 2016.

References

Islands of Tonga
Haʻapai